The Agony and Sweat of the Human Spirit is a 2011 short film by D. Jesse Damazo and Joe Bookman. It was screened at the 2011 Cannes Film Festival in the Cinéfondation section. The film was made as part of the directors' coursework at The University of Iowa. The title is a reference to William Faulkner's Nobel Prize acceptance speech. The film consists of only five shots, each lasting several minutes.

Premise
A quiet ukulele player and his talkative manager struggle to realize their artistic vision in a comic story of loss and friendship.

Cast
 Joe Bookman as The Manager
 D. Jesse Damazo as The Ukuleleist

References

External links
 
 
 Official University of Iowa Press Release
 Cannes program information

2011 films
2011 short films
2011 comedy films
American independent films
Films shot in Iowa
American comedy short films
2011 independent films
2010s English-language films
2010s American films